Rinus Luan Bothma (born ) is a South African rugby union player who last played for  in the Currie Cup and the Rugby Challenge. His regular position is lock.

References

South African rugby union players
Living people
1989 births
People from Roodepoort
Rugby union locks
Rugby union number eights
Boland Cavaliers players
Falcons (rugby union) players
Rugby union players from Gauteng